John Bryan Bronson (born September 9, 1972) is an American 400-meter hurdler, who won the bronze medal at the 1997 World Championships in Athens. He also represented his country at the 1996 Summer Olympics. He won three consecutive titles at the USA Outdoor Track and Field Championships from 1996 to 1998.

His personal best time was 47.03 seconds, achieved in June 1998 in New Orleans.  The time is currently sixth on the all-time list.

He began his career as a sprint specialist and was the gold medallist in the 200 metres and 4×100 metres relay at the 1991 Pan American Junior Athletics Championships. In his youth he was chosen as the Gatorade National Track and Field Athlete of the Year. He studied at Rice University and represented his college athletically in NCAA competition. He was the 1993 NCAA outdoor champion in the 400 m hurdles.

He narrowly missed on sharing the US$1,000,000 jackpot on the 1998 IAAF Golden League circuit as he won the first six meetings but came only sixth in the 1998 IAAF Grand Prix Final. At the end of the season he won at the Goodwill Games with a games record time of 47.15 seconds.

He received a two-year ban from the sport in 1999 after failing a drugs test for steroids. He returned to action in 2002 and 2004 but never again competed at a top level championship.

While at Jasper High School, he was Track and Field News "High School Athlete of the Year" in 1991.

References

External links

1972 births
Living people
American male hurdlers
American sportspeople in doping cases
Doping cases in athletics
Athletes (track and field) at the 1996 Summer Olympics
Goodwill Games medalists in athletics
Olympic track and field athletes of the United States
Rice Owls men's track and field athletes
World Athletics Championships medalists
People from Jasper, Texas
Track and field athletes from Texas
Competitors at the 1998 Goodwill Games